Time in Abkhazia, a partially recognised state largely recognised by most countries as part of Georgia, is given by Moscow Standard Time (MST; UTC+03:00). Abkhazia does not observe daylight saving time.

As Abkhazia is not an internationally recognised sovereign state, it is not granted a zone.tab entry on the IANA time zone database.

See also 
Time in Europe
Time in South Ossetia
List of time zones by country
List of time zones by UTC offset

References

External links 
Current time in Abkhazia at Time.is